Pisgah is an unincorporated community in Randolph County, North Carolina, United States. It is located north of the community of Abner.

References

Unincorporated communities in Randolph County, North Carolina
Unincorporated communities in North Carolina